Globox Arena (formerly Claudelands Arena) is a multi-purpose indoor sports and entertainment arena located in Hamilton, New Zealand. Globox Arena is part of Claudelands Events Centre which contains a 6000-capacity arena and four-star conference and exhibition centre. Construction began on Claudelands Events Centre in 2007 and was completed in 2011 at a cost of $68.4 million ($NZD).

Globox Arena is a unique C-shaped auditorium, the only one of its kind in New Zealand and Australia, which is fully retractable and capable of holding live music and entertainment, international sporting events, large banquets, conferences and exhibitions.

Events
The arena is one of the home venues for the Waikato Bay of Plenty Magic netball team in the ANZ Championship. The New Zealand Breakers have played pre-season games at the venue in 2011 and 2012.

Bob Dylan performed 2 nearly sold-out shows on 9 & 10 August 2014 during his Never Ending Tour 2014.

See also
 List of indoor arenas in New Zealand

References

External links
 

2011 establishments in New Zealand
Netball venues in New Zealand
Music venues in New Zealand
Indoor arenas in New Zealand
Convention centres in New Zealand
Concert halls in New Zealand
Sports venues in Hamilton, New Zealand
Buildings and structures in Hamilton, New Zealand
Basketball venues in New Zealand
Boxing venues in New Zealand
2010s architecture in New Zealand